Dr Chandrabhan Singh is an Indian politician and a former President of the Rajasthan Pradesh Congress Committee. He is a native of Jaisinghpura in Jhunjhunu district of Rajasthan state of India.He is a doctor by profession & completed his education from SMS Medical College, Jaipur.

Background & Achievements 
He is a member of the Indian National Congress in Rajasthan. Before joining the Congress, Chandrabhan served as transport and technical education minister in the Bharatiya Janta Party (BJP) and janta dal government under the then Chief Minister Bhairon Singh Shekhawat from March 1990 to December 1992. He was a minister for the second time when chief minister Ashok Gehlot included him in his government as the energy and industries minister from 1998 to 2003.

References 

Rajasthani politicians
People from Jhunjhunu district
Indian National Congress politicians
Living people
State cabinet ministers of Rajasthan
Bharatiya Janata Party politicians from Rajasthan
Year of birth missing (living people)
Indian National Congress politicians from Rajasthan